Double Dutch is a game in which two long jump ropes turning in opposite directions are jumped by one or more players jumping simultaneously. It is believed to have originated among Dutch immigrants in New York City, although it has been a popular school playground game for much longer than that in the Netherlands, and is now popular worldwide. While it had long been a popular street activity for African American girls in New York City, the modern sport of Double Dutch originated in the early 1970s with NYPD officers Ulysses Williams and David Walker, who formalized the rules for competition. The first official competition was held in 1974. Competitions in Double Dutch range from block parties to the world level. During the spring of 2009, Double Dutch became a varsity sport in New York City public high schools.

In the early 1980s, Double Dutch was strongly associated with New York hip hop culture. It has also been recognized as an element of the genre by notable MCs such as KRS-One.

Technique

Playing Double Dutch involves at least three people: one or more jumping, and two turning the  ropes (according to the American standard).  A jumper usually performs tricks that may involve Gymnastics or breakdance also called breaking or b-boying/b-girling, and may also incorporate fancy foot movements. Based on the WJRF Judging Handbook 2019 Edition, some of the key elements of Double Dutch include Multiples, Power, Gymnastics, Turner Involvement, Releases, Switches and Footwork.

In popular culture
The 1981 single "Double Dutch Bus" by Frankie Smith features African American girls playing this game in the video clip of the song.

The 1983 single by Malcolm McLaren, "Double Dutch" features a number of New York City troupes. It is taken from his debut album Duck Rock.

Doubletime, a documentary from Discovery Films, tells the story of the historic meet-up of rope skipping and Double Dutch. The film follows two top teams, the Bouncing Bulldogs and the Double Dutch Forces, as they train to compete against each other for the first time. The competition took place at the Apollo Theater in Harlem.

The 2002 novel Double Dutch by Sharon M. Draper features a teenager competing in the Double Dutch world championships.

In 2005, Elizabeth Verity, also known as Double Dutch Girl, exhibited her technique around the United States, raising money for the United States military. Double Dutch Girl jumped rope in St. Louis, Chicago, Washington and several small towns throughout the Midwest. Ultimately, her goal is to jump rope in all 50 states.

The 2007 Disney Channel original movie Jump In! features Double Dutch as the central element of its plot.

In 2010, Saltare was on season 5 of MTV's America's Best Dance Crew and the group featured single rope and Double Dutch into their dance routines.

A 2010 PBS documentary, New York Street Games, included Whoopi Goldberg describing Double Dutch.

On January 15, 2007, in honor of Martin Luther King Jr. Day, the Google homepage featured a double Dutch logo with black children playing with white and Asian children, emblematic of the realization of Martin Luther King Jr.'s "I Have A Dream" speech in 1963.

Double Dutch is featured in the Wee Sing production Grandpa's Magical Toys.

In his dual title role of the 2011 film Jack & Jill, Adam Sandler gives a demonstration of Double Dutch jump rope on board the cruise liner.

Competitive play 

The National Double Dutch League (NDDL) holds yearly camps and a Holiday Classic, in which teams from all over the world compete. NDDL was founded in the 1970's by David A. Walker, who had been a police sergeant in Harlem. 
NDDL has been holding its annual Holiday Classic Official Double Dutch Sport & Fusion Freestyle Competition since 1992. The 30th Anniversary Holiday Classic was held in Harlem's Apollo Theater in December 2021.

Double Dutch is also an integral part of USA Jump Rope Tournaments as well as the AAU Junior Olympic Games and the World Jump Rope Federation's worldwide annual competitions.

The World Jump Rope Championships were held in July, 2012, at George Washington University, in Washington D.C.

Double Dutch competitions are categorized as compulsory, freestyle, and speed rope.

In France 
Double Dutch is associated with early French hip-hop scenes.  It was introduced in late 1982 when the World Champion Fantastic Four Double Dutch team came to France alongside the New York City Rap Tour. Groups such as the Dutch Force System were some of the better-known Double Dutch groups. Double Dutch was seen as "the symbol of a strong and affirmed femininity in hip-hop".

References

Further reading
 Veronica Chambers, Double Dutch, Jump At The Sun; 1 edition (October 14, 2002)
 Kyra D. Gaunt, The Games Black Girls Play: Learning the Ropes from Double-Dutch to Hip-hop, Published 2006 NYU Press

External links 
 
 Doubletime, Discovery Channel (documentary)
 National Double Dutch League
 USA Jump Rope website
 British Rope Skipping Association

Girls' toys and games
Games of physical skill
Aerobic exercise